Priodiscus is a genus of air-breathing land snails, terrestrial pulmonate gastropod mollusks in the family Streptaxidae.

Distribution 
The genus Priodiscus is endemic to the Seychelles.

Species
There are three species within the genus Priodiscus and they include:
 Priodiscus costatus
 Priodiscus serratus (Adams, 1868)
 Priodiscus spinatus

References

Further reading 
 Gerlach J. (1995). "The taxonomy and affinities of the genus Priodiscus (Mollusca: Gastropoda: Streptaxidae)". Journal of Conchology, London 35: 357-368.

Streptaxidae